Chiricahua multidentata is a species of geometrid moth in the family Geometridae. It is found in Central America and North America.

The MONA or Hodges number for Chiricahua multidentata is 6641.

References

Further reading

 
 

Nacophorini
Articles created by Qbugbot
Moths described in 1941